Joseph A. Pittman (born March 31, 1977) is a Republican member of the Pennsylvania State Senate, representing the 41st district since May 2019.

Early life
Pittman graduated from Purchase Line High School in 1995 and was appointed to the local school board at age 18; he continued in service on the board until his graduation from Pennsylvania State University in December 1998 with a bachelor's degree in political science. After a brief employment in Bedford County, Pittman joined Donald C. White's successful campaign for state senator in 2000 and was named his chief of staff at age 23.

State senator
White resigned as state senator in late February 2019 and a special election was scheduled for May 21, 2019, to determine his successor. Pittman announced his candidacy for the seat in March 2019 and the Republican Party of Pennsylvania supported him unanimously as their candidate. Pittman won nearly two-thirds of the vote against Democratic challenger Susan Boser and became the next state senator for the 41st district.

Pittman chairs the Senate Urban Affairs & Housing Committee and serves on the Environmental Resources & Energy, Appropriations, Banking & Insurance, Consumer Protection & Professional Licensure, and Judiciary Committees. He is also a board member of the Pennsylvania Infrastructure Investment Authority (PENNVEST).

Personal life
Pittman and his wife Gina live in Indiana, Pennsylvania, with their two sons and twin daughters.

References

External links
Pennsylvania State Senate – Joe Pittman – official PA Senate website
Senator Pittman – official caucus website

|-

1977 births
21st-century American politicians
Living people
People from Indiana, Pennsylvania
Pennsylvania State University alumni
Political chiefs of staff
Republican Party Pennsylvania state senators